Anže Jelar (born 18 August 1991) is a Slovenian footballer who plays as a forward for DSG Sele Zell.

References

External links
NZS profile 

1991 births
Living people
Sportspeople from Kranj
Slovenian footballers
Association football forwards
NK Triglav Kranj players
NK Domžale players
Slovenian Second League players
Slovenian PrvaLiga players
Slovenian expatriate footballers
Slovenian expatriate sportspeople in Austria
Expatriate footballers in Austria
Slovenia youth international footballers
Slovenia under-21 international footballers